The Michigan Daily is the weekly student newspaper of the University of Michigan. Its first edition was published on September 29, 1890. The newspaper is financially and editorially independent of the University's administration and other student groups, but shares a university building with other student publications on 420 Maynard Street, north of the Michigan Union and Huetwell Student Activities Center. In 2007, renovations to the historic building at 420 Maynard were completed, funded entirely by private donations from alumni. To dedicate the renovated building, a reunion of the staffs of The Michigan Daily, the Michiganensian yearbook, and the Gargoyle Humor Magazine was held on October 26–28, 2007.

The Michigan Daily is published weekly in broadsheet form during the Fall and Winter semesters and in tabloid form from May to August. Broadsheets contain a lengthy SportsWednesday Sports section and occasionally an extended, themed issue called The B-Side from the Arts section. They also include a magazine, originally titled Weekend Magazine. In the fall of 2005, the magazine was renamed The Statement, a reference to former Daily Editor in Chief Tom Hayden's Port Huron Statement. School year circulation is 7,500 copies per day. It has over 230,000 unique visitors per month to its website.

Following the closure of The Ann Arbor News in July 2009, The Michigan Daily became the only printed daily newspaper published in Washtenaw County. In 2010, a visiting former press secretary said the Daily staff had a "strong moral responsibility" to expand their coverage and try to reach a regional audience as a mainstream daily paper.

History

In 1952, the Soviet delegate to the United Nations, F. A. Novikov, singled out the newspaper as emblematic of American warmongering. On April 12, 1955, when the success of Jonas Salk's polio vaccine was announced at the University of Michigan the Daily was the first newspaper to report it. In 1957, the Daily sent a staff member to Little Rock, Arkansas who, pretending to be a student, attended classes on the first day of integration.

Activist and politician Tom Hayden, a former Daily editor in chief who helped found Students for a Democratic Society while editing the Daily, came to personify the publication's editorial philosophy during the 1960s. The paper was the subject of national press coverage when, in 1967, it urged the legalization of marijuana, and again during the Gulf War in 1991, when it called for the reinstatement of the military draft.

The Daily was instrumental in the spread of the Paul is dead urban legend. An October 14, 1969 Daily article by Fred LaBour and John Gray, entitled "McCartney Dead; New Evidence Brought to Light", itemized various "clues", many of them of their own invention. Their "reporting" of McCartney's death is claimed by Beatleologist Andru J. Reeve to have been "the single most significant factor in the breadth of the rumor's spread."

The first female editor-in-chief of the Daily was Harriett Woods, who later served in Missouri State government, ran for the Senate twice in the 1980s nearly beating John Danforth the first time, and led the National Women's Political Caucus through its Year of the Woman in 1992.

On January 28, 2014, the Daily earned national recognition for breaking news that a Michigan football player had been separated from the University for sexual misconduct.

Notable alumni
Clarence Addison Brimmer Jr.
Jonathan Chait
Lindsay Chaney
Thomas Dewey
Rich Eisen
Owen Gleiberman
Frank Bunker Gilbreth Jr.
Sanjay Gupta
Tom Hayden
Ken Kelley
Golda Krolik
Ann Marie Lipinski
Preeti N. Malani
David Margolick
Arthur Miller
Daniel Okrent
Alan Paul
Eugene Robinson
Adam Schefter
George A. Spater, former chairman of American Airlines
Robin Wright
Mike Wallace
Bruce Wasserstein
Harriett Woods

Pulitzer Prize winners
Daily alumni who have won a Pulitzer Prize include:

 Daniel Biddle, 1987 Pulitzer Prize for Investigative Reporting, The Philadelphia Inquirer with H. G. Bissinger and Fredric N. Tulsky; Staff / The Sun Newspapers of Omaha, NE, including Stanford Lipsey, 1973 Pulitzer Prize for Local Investigative Specialized Reporting
 Amy Harmon, 2008 Pulitzer Prize for Explanatory Reporting/The New York Times
 Stephen Henderson (1992) and former editorial page editor for The Michigan Daily, won a Pulitzer Prize for Commentary in 2014
 Ann Marie Lipinski, 1988 Pulitzer Prize for Investigative Reporting , the Chicago Tribune with Dean Baquet and William Gaines
 Arthur Miller, 1949 Pulitzer Prize for Drama
 Lisa Pollak, 1997 Pulitzer Prize for Feature Writing, The Baltimore Sun
 Eugene Robinson, Michigan Daily Co-Editor-in-Chief in 1973–74, who was awarded a Pulitzer in April 2009 for his Washington Post commentaries on the 2008 presidential campaign

Awards 

 2021 Society of Professional Journalists Mark of Excellence Awards Region 4, 12 awards
 2020 Society of Professional Journalists Mark of Excellence Awards Region 4, 10 awards
 2018 Michigan College Press Association, 14 awards

References

External links

Publications established in 1890
Student newspapers published in Michigan
University of Michigan mass media
1890 establishments in Michigan
Mass media in Ann Arbor, Michigan